Ulrika Melin (1767–1834) was a Swedish textile artist and a member of the Royal Swedish Academy of Arts.

She was born to Major Lars Melin and was a sister of General Major Henrik Georg Melin. She was married to the governor of Västerås Castle, Peter Thure Gerhard Drufva, in 1788. Melin was a textile artist with "an unusual ability to sew landskapes". In 1784, she was elected to the Royal Swedish Academy of Arts for a work in white sateen inspired by the work of Claude Lorrain.

See also 
 Wendela Gustafva Sparre
 Maria Johanna Görtz

References

Further reading

External links 
  Anteckningar om svenska qvinnor  
 Dahlberg och Hagström: Svenskt konstlexikon. Allhems Förlag (1953) Malmö.

Swedish women artists
Swedish textile artists
Members of the Royal Swedish Academy of Arts
1767 births
1834 deaths
18th-century Swedish people
19th-century Swedish people
18th-century Swedish artists
19th-century Swedish artists
19th-century women textile artists
19th-century textile artists
18th-century women textile artists
18th-century textile artists